The Belarus men's national field hockey team represents Belarus in men's international field hockey and is controlled by the Belarus Hockey Federation, the governing body for field hockey in Belarus.

In response to the 2022 Russian invasion of Ukraine, the FIH banned Belarusian officials from FIH events.

Competitive record

World Cup

European Championships

World League and FIH Series

*Draws include matches decided on a shoot-out.

See also
Belarus women's national field hockey team

References

European men's national field hockey teams
National team
Field hockey
Men's sport in Belarus